Telaprocera is a genus of Australian orb-weaver spiders first described by A. M. T. Harmer & V. W. Framenau in 2008.  it contains only two species.

References

Araneidae
Araneomorphae genera
Spiders of Australia